Reinhold Begas (15 July 1831 – 3 August 1911) was a German sculptor.

Biography
Begas was born in Berlin, son of the painter Carl Joseph Begas. He received his early education (1846–1851) studying under Christian Daniel Rauch and Ludwig Wilhelm Wichmann. During a period of study in Italy, from 1856 to 1858, he was influenced by Arnold Böcklin and Franz von Lenbach in the direction of a naturalistic style in sculpture. This tendency was marked in the group Borussia, executed for the facade of the exchange in Berlin, which first brought him into general notice.

In 1861 Begas was appointed professor at the art school at Weimar, but retained the appointment only a few months. That he was chosen, after competition, to execute the statue of Friedrich Schiller for the Gendarmenmarkt in Berlin, was a high tribute to the fame he had already acquired, and the result, one of the finest statues in the German metropolis, entirely justified his selection. Since the year 1870, Begas dominated the plastic art in the Kingdom of Prussia, but especially in Berlin. Among his chief works during this period are the colossal statue of Borussia for the Hall of Glory; the Neptune fountain in bronze on the Schlossplatz; the statue of Alexander von Humboldt, and the Kaiser-Wilhelm-Nationaldenkmal, all in Berlin; the sarcophagus of Emperor Frederick III in the mausoleum of the Church of Peace at Potsdam; and, lastly, the national monument to Emperor William I, the statue of Otto von Bismarck before the Reichstag building, and several of the statues in the Siegesallee.

Gallery

See also
 Centaur and Nymph
 Mercury and Psyche

References

Attribution

External links

 

1831 births
1911 deaths
Artists from Berlin
People from the Province of Brandenburg
20th-century German sculptors
20th-century German male artists
19th-century German sculptors
19th-century German male artists
German male sculptors
Recipients of the Pour le Mérite (civil class)
German people of Belgian descent